The Victoria Fire Department (VFD) serves the City of Victoria, British Columbia in Canada.

VFD operates three land-based fire stations, plus a marine unit. It is neighboured by Oak Bay Fire Department, Saanich Fire Department and Esquimalt Fire Department.

References 

Fire departments in British Columbia